REVIVAL Mobile Management Suite is a mobile device management tool developed and provided by The Institution. The Institution was founded in 2006 and is based in Stockholm, with a research and development office in Hong Kong.

REVIVAL has been developed to support a range of mobile operating systems, including iPhone, Android, Windows Mobile, Symbian and OMA-DM devices.

REVIVAL Mobile Management Suite can be installed on-site at the customer's facilities or it can be hosted by a selected hosting partner. 
One of the biggest organizations connected to REVIVAL today is “SJ”, Swedish Railways.

Technology

The main purpose of the technology is to oversee diverse mobile device populations by securing and storing mobile phone data. It is also used to facilitate in handling, using and updating mobile phones.

Its features include:

 Inventory and asset control
 Remote control of display, file systems and more
 Support cases management
 Mail settings for MS Exchange, IBM Lotus Notes, and Nitrodesk Touchdown among others
 Application deployment, configuration and handling
 Location-based reporting 
 Backup, restore and migration 
 Remote wipe
 Mobile activity logging 
 Security

References

External links 
 Official website

2006 establishments in Sweden
Mobile device management software